This is a list of the winning and nominated programs of the Primetime Emmy Award for Outstanding Main Title Design presented for the best main title sequence in television programming. Prior to 1997, the award was presented for Outstanding Individual Achievement in Graphic Design and Title Sequences or Outstanding Graphic Design and Title Sequences. In the 1980s and early 1990s, the award was presented with the "possibility of one, more than one, or no award given," resulting in years where there were nominees without any winner or multiple winners.

Winners and nominations

1970s

1980s

1990s

2000s

2010s

2020s

Notes

Programs with multiple awards
2 awards
 Game of Thrones

Programs with multiple nominations

3 nominations
 American Horror Story
 Westworld

2 nominations
 Game of Thrones
 Saturday Night Live
 True Detective
 The Wonderful World of Disney

References

Main Title Design
Film and television opening sequences